Đức Ninh Đông is an urban ward (phường) in Đồng Hới, Quảng Bình Province, in Vietnam. It covers an area of 3.13 km2 and has a population of 4726.

Đồng Hới
Populated places in Quảng Bình province
Communes of Quảng Bình province